Charles Tait (15 November 1868 – 27 June 1933), together with two of his brothers, was an Australian concert, film and theatrical entrepreneur, but his most notable achievement was as the director and writer of The Story of the Kelly Gang, an Australian film, regarded as the world's first feature-length film.  The film was first shown on 26 December 1906.

Tait was born in Castlemaine, Victoria, the son of John Turnbull Tait (1830–1902), a tailor from Scalloway, Shetland Islands, Scotland, and his English wife Sarah, née Leeming. John Tait migrated to Victoria in 1862 and settled at Castlemaine where he married Sarah. They had nine children: including Charles (1868–1933), John Henry (1871–1955), James Nevin (1876–1961), Edward Joseph (1878–1947) and Frank Samuel (1883–1965) (later Sir Frank). In about 1879, the Taits moved to Richmond, a suburb of Melbourne, Victoria. On 21 June 1899 Charles married Elizabeth Jane Veitch; and they were to have two daughters and two sons.

The Tait brothers' earliest presentations centred on the Athenaeum Hall in Collins Street, Melbourne, with concerts often including popular short, film screenings. This interest led them to join with Millard Johnson and William Gibson in the production of The Story of the Kelly Gang which premièred on 26 December 1906 at the Athenaeum. The film is now recognized as the first feature-length narrative film.

In March 1911, the brothers John and Nevin Tait, and Millard Johnson and William Gibson merged their film interests in Amalgamated Pictures which for a short time continued to produce features and newsreels before combining with its main competitor, Australasian Films, in 1912. After 1911, the Taits concentrated on concert presentation and occasional film exhibition.

The Tait brothers were associated with J. C. Williamson Ltd. Edward Joseph Tait was a stage producer with J. C. Williamson and General Manager of his company from 1913 to 1916, then joined his brothers in J & N Tait.

Charles died in Melbourne in 1933.

Filmography
Living London (1904) – distributor
The Story of the Kelly Gang (1906) – finance, possibly director

References

External links

Entry in the Australian Dictionary of Biography

1868 births
1933 deaths
1900s in Australian cinema
Australian film producers
People from Castlemaine, Victoria
Australian people of Scottish descent
Australian people of English descent
People from Richmond, Victoria
Australian film directors